Endococcus nanellus is a species of lichenicolous fungus in the order Dothideales. It is known from Alaska, Canada, Greenland, Hawaii, Japan, Russia, South-Korea, and Kazakhstan.

Host species
Endococcus nanellus is known to infect numerous species of the genus Stereocaulon, including the following species:
 Stereocaulon alpinum
 Stereocaulon botryosum
 Stereocaulon glareosum
 Stereocaulon grande
 Stereocaulon myriocarpum
 Stereocaulon nigrum
 Stereocaulon paschale
 Stereocaulon saxatile
 Stereocaulon tomentosum
 Stereocaulon vesuvianum

References

Fungi described in 1891
Fungi of Canada
Fungi of Greenland
Fungi of Japan
Fungi of Kazakhstan
Fungi of Russia
Fungi of South Korea
Fungi of the United States
Dothideales
Taxa named by Otto Ludwig Arnold Ohlert